Southwest Passage is a 1954 American Pathécolor Western film directed by Ray Nazarro and starring Joanne Dru, Rod Cameron and John Ireland, who are determined to make a unique trek across the west, using camels as his beasts of burden. The picture was originally released in 3-D.

Plot summary
With $20,000 in stolen gold, Clint McDonald, his girl Lilly and wounded brother Jeb head for the hills, just ahead of a posse. Lilly goes to town to find a doctor for Jeb, then returns with the best she can find, Dr. Stanton, a drunken veterinarian.

Clint becomes aware of a camel-led caravan being led by Edward Fitzpatrick Beale and decides to join it, taking Dr. Stanton's medical kit and pretending to be him. Lilly rides up later, claiming to be separated from a wagon train, but Jeb dies from his injuries.

Mule skinner Matt Caroll is at odds with Clint from the beginning, becoming attracted to Lilly and suspicious of Clint's skill as a doctor. After scout Tall Tale is bitten by a gila monster and needs a limb amputated, Clint's true identity is revealed and Beale makes him leave. Carroll follows, after the gold, but Clint kills him. Clint repents to Beale by leading the caravan to water and helping fend off attacking Apache braves. He reunites with Lilly and vows to return the gold.

Cast
 Rod Cameron as Edward Fitzgerald Beale
 Joanne Dru as Lilly
 John Ireland as Clint McDonald
 John Dehner as Matt Carroll
 Guinn 'Big Boy' Williams as Tall Tale
 Darryl Hickman as Jeb
 Stuart Randall as Lt. Owens
 Mark Hanna as Hi Jolly
 Douglas Fowley as Toad Ellis
 Morris Ankrum as Doc Stanton

Production
Parts of the film were shot in Johnson Canyon and Coral Pink Sand Dunes in Utah.

Notes
Navajo Indians from Utah played Apaches in the film. John Ireland and Joanne Dru were husband and wife when this film was made.
This used to be one of only two feature films for which the original 3-D elements are lost, the other being Top Banana (1954). However, 3D Film Archive founder Bob Furmanek has confirmed that the four missing reels from the right side were located in a UK film lab in 2018 by Darren Gross of MGM. The UK lab had acquired the inventory of a bankrupt Italian lab, and the reels in question had been labeled as “Camels West”, which Darren knew to be the film’s UK title. The film is now slated to be restored by the 3D Film Archive and released on Blu-ray 3D in 2024 by Kino Lorber. 
The film was originally known as Camel Corps.

See also
 List of incomplete or partially lost films

References

External links
 
 
 

1954 films
1954 Western (genre) films
1950s English-language films
American 3D films
1954 3D films
American Western (genre) films
Films directed by Ray Nazarro
Films produced by Edward Small
Films scored by Emil Newman
Films scored by Arthur Lange
United Artists films
Films shot in Utah
1950s American films